Justujoo is an Indian soap opera which aired on Zee TV on Tuesday evenings in 2002. Justajoo went off air after 50 episodes. According to the producer, "with Justajoo we covered only office expenses and made no profit." Justujoo is re-telecasted on 9X channel in 2013.

Plot
Justujoo is about a lawyer, Lalit Sharma (Harsh Chhaya), his wife Leela (Pallavi Joshi) and her sister Neerja (Arpita Pandey). The story revolves about how Lalit is fed up with his uneducated and old fashioned wife. He gets drawn towards his educated, career-oriented, modern sister-in-law, Neerja (Arpita Pandey). Neerja is married to Mehul (Nitesh Pandey) but their relationship does not last. Later, Neerja gets pregnant after getting into a relationship with her brother-in-law.  She has a baby girl, but dies soon after that. Leela raises Neerja's daughter as her own child, along with her own two daughters. Leela and Lalit already have two daughters of their own; they grow up and get married. Leela's elder daughter does not like her stepsister. Neerja's daughter never finds the truth that Leela is not her real mother. The story ends with Leela, her husband and Neerja's daughter looking at the stars in the sky.

Cast
 Harsh Chhaya as Lalit Sharma
 Pallavi Joshi as Leela Sharma
 Arpita Pandey as Neeraja
 Vaquar Shaikh as Satish
 Nitesh Pandey as Mehul
 Karan Lukha as Moksh
 Eva sher ali as Shruti
 Madhavi Kumar as Deepa
 Nishikant Dixit as Jeweller
 Ghanshyam Nayak as Lalit's client
 Rajesh Khera as Anurag
 Nagesh Bhonsle as Nagesh
 Kavita Kapoor as Kavita
 Smita Oak as Doctor
 Kiran Randhawa as Mehul's Mother
 Mahroo Sheikh as Mehul's Director
 Disha Vakani as Mehul's makeup artist
 Melanie Nazareth as Priya
 Atul Srivastava as Lalit's Assistant
 Kalindi as Leela's cousin
 Ishtiaque Khan as Neeraja's Boss
 Sonalia Kapadia as Neeraja's daughter
 Aditi Pandya as Older Rima
 Seema shinde as Neeraja's Professor
 Asha Singh as Neeraja's Aunt
 Shadab Khan as House Dealer
 Zubeda Khan as Victim
 Jaspir Thandi as Isha
 Baby Nida as Younger Bhavna
 Umang Jain as Younger Rima
 Rakesh Bidua as Hotel Receptionist
 Alka Kaushal as Lalit's Colleague

References

External links

Indian television soap operas
Serial drama television series
Zee TV original programming
2002 Indian television series debuts